Elgin may refer to:

Places

Canada 
 Elgin County, Ontario
 Elgin Settlement, a 19th-century community for freed slaves located in present-day North Buxton and South Buxton, Chatham-Kent, Ontario
 Elgin, a village in Rideau Lakes, Ontario
 Port Elgin, Ontario, Bruce County
 Elgin, Manitoba
 Elgin Parish, New Brunswick
 Elgin, New Brunswick, a community in Elgin Parish
 Elgin, Nova Scotia
 Elgin, Quebec
 Elgin Street (Ottawa), a street in the Downtown core of Ottawa, Ontario, Canada
 Port Elgin, New Brunswick

Hong Kong
 Elgin Street, Hong Kong, a street in Central, Hong Kong
 Elgin Street, former name of Haiphong Road in Tsim Sha Tsui, Kowloon

New Zealand
 Elgin, New Zealand, a suburb of Gisborne

South Africa
Elgin, Western Cape, a large valley famous for deciduous farming, which lies to the south-east of Cape Town

United Kingdom
 Elgin, Moray, the administrative and commercial centre for Moray, Scotland, from which other names derive
 Elgin railway station
 Elgin Crescent, a street in Notting Hill, London
 Elgin Street, Bacup, in Lancashire, one of the world's shortest streets

United States 
 Elgin, Alabama
 Elgin, Arizona
 Elgin, Illinois
 Elgin station (Illinois), a train station
 Elgin, Iowa
 Elgin, Kansas
 Elgin, Minnesota
 Elgin (Natchez, Mississippi), listed on the NRHP in Mississippi
 Elgin, Missouri
 Elgin, Nebraska
 Elgin, Nevada
 Elgin (Warrenton, North Carolina), listed on the NRHP in North Carolina
 Elgin, North Dakota
 Elgin, Ohio
 Elgin, Oklahoma
 Elgin, Oregon
 Elgin, Pennsylvania
 Elgin, Kershaw County, South Carolina
 Elgin, Lancaster County, South Carolina
 Elgin, South Carolina (disambiguation)
 Elgin, Tennessee
 Elgin, Texas
 Elgin, Utah
 Elgin Township (disambiguation)

Constituencies and electoral districts

Canada
 Elgin (electoral district) (1935–1997), a federal electoral district in the province of Ontario
 Elgin (provincial electoral district), a provincial riding in Ontario, Canada, that was merged into the riding of Elgin-Middlesex

United Kingdom
 Elgin (Parliament of Scotland constituency)
 Elgin Burghs (UK Parliament constituency), a District of Burghs constituency from 1708 to 1918
 Elginshire (UK Parliament constituency), a county constituency from 1708 to 1832

People 
 Elgin (name)
 Earl of Elgin or Lord Elgin, the title of several individuals
 Thomas Bruce, 7th Earl of Elgin (1766–1841), British diplomat
 James Bruce, 8th Earl of Elgin (1811–1863), Canadian governor

Art, entertainment, and media

Art
 The Elgin Marbles, Greek bas-reliefs housed at the British Museum

Literature
The Elginists, an organization featured in Elly Griffiths' Ruth Galloway novel A Room Full of Bones (2012) that describes itself as "dedicated to the return of cultural artefacts to their countries of origin", including the Elgin Marbles

Music
 Elgin (album), a 2011 album by American R&B singer and songwriter Ginuwine
 The Elgins, a Motown group active from 1962 to 1967
 "The Elgins", an early name used by The Temptations in their pre-David Ruffin era

Brands and enterprises 
 Elgin (automobile), manufactured by Elgin Motor Car Corporation (1916–1923) and Elgin Motors, Inc. (1923–1924)
 Elgin, Ladbroke Grove, a public house in Ladbroke Grove, London
 The Elgin, Darjeeling, the summer residence of the Maharaja of Cooch Behar, converted to a hotel
 Elgin National Watch Company (1864–1968), a US watch company that sold watches under the names Elgin, Lord Elgin, and Lady Elgin
 Elgin tablets, a name for a tablet
 Glen Elgin, a single malt whisky from Speyside

Other uses
 Elgin Formation, a geologic formation in Minnesota, United States
 Elgin Park Secondary School, a high school in Surrey, British Columbia
 The Elgin–Franklin fields in the North Sea

See also 
 Eglin (disambiguation)
 Elgin Academy (disambiguation)
 Elgin High School (disambiguation)
 Elgin Museum (disambiguation)
 Elgin Theatre (disambiguation)
 Elginia, a turtle-like parareptile of the Late Permian period
 Lady Elgin (disambiguation)